The Ebony Hillbillies is an old-time string band based in NYC, New York City.

A recording of their music is held in the archives of the Smithsonian Institution's Smithsonian Center for Folklife and Cultural Heritage.

History 
During the 1980s Henrique Prince began putting together a band due to "an idea of specializing in dance music, because I really liked the idea of the violin as a dance instrument." He also wanted to make "music African Americans used to perform and dance to before they found the blues and jazz and the other stuff became associated with grizzled mountain white guys".  Based in New York City, The Ebony Hillbillies began performing on New York subway platforms. As the band continued to perform they were invited to perform in venues such as Carnegie Hall, the Lincoln Center, Washington state's Wintergrass Festival, and the Kennedy Center.

Members

Henrique Prince: violin, vocals
Gloria Thomas Gassaway: bones, lead vocals
Reggie “A.R.” Ferguson: washboard, “cowboy" percussion kit (consisting of organic wood and metal materials)
William “Salty Bill” Salter: acoustic bass, voice
Newman Taylor Baker: washboard
Allanah Salter: vocals

Additional Members 
Ricky “Dirty Red” Gordon: washboard, percussion
Dave Colding: acoustic bass, vocals
Iris Thomas: vocals
AW: banjo, bass

Deceased 
Norris Washington Bennett: 5-string banjo, mountain dulcimer, lead vocals

Discography
 2004 — Sabrina’s Holiday (EH MUSIC) 
 2005 — I Thought You Knew (EH MUSIC)
 2011 — Barefoot And Flying (EH MUSIC)
 2015 — Slappin’ A Rabbit - LiVE! (EH MUSIC)
 2017 — 5 Miles From Town (EH MUSIC)

Further reading

References

External links
 

Old-time bands
Performing arts pages with videographic documentation
American blues musical groups
Musical groups from New York City
Culture of New York City